AFL Live is a sports game in the AFL series of Australian rules football video games. It was developed by Big Ant Studios for PlayStation 3, Xbox 360 and Microsoft Windows. It was released on 21 April 2011. The Game of the Year Edition was released for The PlayStation Network and Xbox Live Marketplace on 6 June 2012 and was released for optical disc on 12 July 2012. Commentary is provided by Dennis Cometti and Brian Taylor.

Gameplay
The gameplay has gone more in-depth with the core mechanics. Some specific improvements include, faster ball movement and a more free flowing game, improved control and camera systems, and more scope for tactical adjustments. The possible addition of obscurities such as "behind the play" incidents will potentially add to the longevity of the gameplay experience.

All officially licensed AFL teams are included in the game. While it also features three extra teams, Victoria, Indigenous All Stars and an All Stars Team (Dream team) from the AFL Hall of Fame Tribute Match.

Features
 Single Match:
An exhibition match, can be played competitively or cooperatively.
 Toyota AFL Premiership Season:
Select a number of teams through the AFL season.
 NAB Cup:
Select a number of teams through the NAB Cup.
 Custom Season:
Create and play with a personalised team, from the Footy Factory, or compete in a straight knockout tournament.
 Custom Finals:
Select 8 teams to play in the AFL finals series.
 Training Mode:
Training mode includes tutorials on the controls of the game.
 Footy Factory:
The "Footy Factory" allows the player to create their own football player or team. A custom team will start with a 6.5 million dollar salary cap. To offer better balancing for online play, created teams can be used online. The online component offers ranked matches and a detailed XP system, that rewards players for good performance in-game.

Online
The game features online play, with Big Ant Studios stating that it uses the PlayStation Network, Xbox Live and Games for Windows – Live to their full advantage. Up to 4 players with Xbox Live, 7 with PSN, are able to play either cooperatively or competitively online. Online play features a full-fledged XP System where players rank up and collect badges for achieving set tasks.

Stadiums
The game licensed all 17 teams and 12 stadiums from the 2011 AFL season.
Stadiums were
AAMI Stadium, West Lakes
The Gabba, Brisbane
Etihad Stadium, Melbourne
MCG, Melbourne
Patersons Stadium, Perth
Skilled Stadium, Geelong
Gold Coast Stadium, Gold Coast
Manuka Oval, Canberra
Aurora Stadium, Launceston
TIO Stadium, Darwin
SCG, Sydney
ANZ Stadium, Sydney
The Game of the Year Edition licensed all 18 teams and 13 stadiums from the 2012 AFL season.

Game of the Year Edition
The Game of the Year Edition is an update DLC for the 2012 AFL season, with updated team lists and on-field uniforms for the 2012 season, Skoda Stadium is to be usable and the ability to play in The Toyota AFL Premiership Season mode as The Greater Western Sydney Giants. It was made available on The PlayStation Network for PlayStation 3 and Xbox Live Marketplace for both Xbox 360 and Microsoft Windows on 6 June 2012 and was released for video game retailers on 12 July 2012.

Reception 

AFL Live has received mostly average reviews, with a 64% aggregate rating on GameRankings.

IGN rated it 6 out of 10. MMGN and also GameSpot rating it 6.5/10, with MMGN summing up, "The best AFL game to date, and while full of issues, a positive start". The Good Game talk show's two reviewers gave the game a 6/10 and 6.5/10. While Game Arena gave it a lower score of 4/10.

References

External links
 AFL Live at Big Ant Studios.com
 AFL Live at Tru Blu Entertainment.com.au

AFL (video game series)
2011 video games
PlayStation 3 games
Xbox 360 games
Windows games
Australian rules football video games
Games for Windows certified games
Australia-exclusive video games
Video games developed in Australia
Video games set in Australia
Multiplayer and single-player video games
PhyreEngine games
Big Ant Studios games
Tru Blu Entertainment games